This is a list of flyovers, bridges and viaducts in Singapore, including those for pedestrians and vehicular traffic.

In Singapore, a "flyover" is an overpass that crosses over another road, while a "bridge" is a structure that crosses a body of water. A "viaduct" usually refers to a flyover that crosses over multiple roads and spans several kilometres.

Only structures that are officially named are listed below. There are many more bridges in various parts of Singapore and its outlying islands that exist without names.

Pedestrian bridges

Pedestrian overhead bridges

Vehicular bridges

Vehicular flyovers

Vehicular viaducts

See also
List of underpasses and tunnels in Singapore

References

Bridges
Singapore
Bridges